Helios Ridge is a broad rock ridge,  long, that extends in an east-northeast direction from Mount Helios in the Olympus Range, to the vicinity of Lake Brownworth in Wright Valley, Victoria Land, Antarctica. The ridge rises between the east snout of Clark Glacier and Wright Valley, causing meltwater streams to flow east around it to reach Onyx River. It was named by the Advisory Committee on Antarctic Names in 1997 in association with Mount Helios and other features in this area that are named from Greek mythology.

References

Ridges of Victoria Land
McMurdo Dry Valleys